Dame Rosemary Christian Howard  (5 September 1916 – 22 April 1999), a British Christian theologian, was one of the five children of Geoffrey William Algernon Howard and his wife, Ethel Christian ( Methuen) Howard. She was awarded the honorary degree of Lambeth Master of Arts by the Archbishop of Canterbury.

Born at her family's Castle Howard, she worked for the ordination of women, as well as being active in the ecumenical movement. She was remembered as "a great character, a great Christian woman and a formidable person" by the Archdeacon of York, George Austin, who was one her staunchest opponents on the ordination of women. Her grandmother, Rosalind Howard, Countess of Carlisle, had been a tireless worker for the women's suffrage organization - as a suffragist, wedded to legal means, rather than a suffragette - and Howard followed her example in her work to achieve the ordination of women to the priesthood. 

A founding member of the Movement for the Ordination of Women, she concentrated her major effort on the synodical process to secure the necessary legislation. In 1972 she wrote a report for General Synod entitled The Ordination of Women to Priesthood. She earned the Lambeth Diploma in Theology, was appointed a lay canon provincial of York Minster, served on General Synod 1970–85, was a delegate to the World Council of Churches (WCC) in 1961 and 1968, was appointed to the Faith and Order Commission of the WCC and served as the first woman vice-moderator.

References
 Charles Mosley, editor, Burke's Peerage, Baronetage & Knightage, 107th edition, 3 volumes (Wilmington, Delaware: Burke's Peerage (Genealogical Books) Ltd, 2003), volume 1, p. 689

External links

 Papers of Dame Christian Howard held at the Borthwick Institute for Archives, University of York
 IAWN Obituary

British Anglicans
Dames Commander of the Order of the British Empire
1916 births
1999 deaths
British theologians
Christian
Place of birth missing
Place of death missing